The BCCI Awards are a set of annual cricket awards given by the Board of Control for Cricket in India (BCCI). The awards recognise and honour the best Indian international and domestic cricketers for the past year. The awards were first given in 2006–07.

Tabular list

List of winners

2006–07
 Polly Umrigar Award for international cricketer of the year: Sachin Tendulkar (trophy and Rs 500,000)
 CK Nayudu Award for lifetime achievement: Nari Contractor (trophy and Rs 1.5 million)
 Madhavrao Scindia Award for most runs in Ranji Trophy: Robin Uthappa (trophy and Rs 100,000)
 Madhavrao Scindia Award for most wickets in Ranji Trophy: Ranadeb Bose (trophy and Rs 100,000)
 Best Cricket Association of the Year for overall performance: Mumbai (trophy)
 M A Chidambaram Trophy for best Under-15 cricketer: Mandeep Singh (trophy and Rs 50,000)
 M A Chidambaram Trophy for best Under-17 cricketer: Ajay Rana (trophy and Rs 50,000)
 M A Chidambaram Trophy for best Under-19 cricketer: Ajinkya Rahane (trophy and Rs 50,000)
 M A Chidambaram Trophy for best Under-22 cricketer: Manoj Tiwary (trophy and Rs 50,000)
 M A Chidambaram Trophy for best woman cricketer: Jaya Sharma (trophy and Rs 50,000)

Other awards
 Jhulan Goswami was awarded a trophy and a cheque for Rs one lakh for becoming the ICC Women's Cricketer of the Year 2007.
 Anju Jain and Anjum Chopra were given a trophy each for winning the Arjuna Award in women's cricket for 2006 and 2007 respectively.

Ref:

2007–08
 Polly Umrigar Award for international cricketer of the year: Virender Sehwag (trophy and Rs 500,000)
 CK Nayudu Award for lifetime achievement: Gundappa Viswanath (trophy and Rs 1.5 million)
 Madhavrao Scindia Award for most runs in Ranji Trophy: Cheteshwar Pujara (trophy and Rs 100,000)
 Madhavrao Scindia Award for most wickets in Ranji Trophy: Sudeep Tyagi (trophy and Rs 100,000)
 Best Cricket Association of the Year for overall performance: Maharashtra (trophy)
 M A Chidambaram Trophy for best Under-15 cricketer: Ankit Bawne (trophy and Rs 50,000)
 M A Chidambaram Trophy for best Under-17 cricketer: Mandeep Singh (trophy and Rs 50,000)
 M A Chidambaram Trophy for best Under-19 cricketer: Bhuvneshwar Kumar (trophy and Rs 50,000)
 M A Chidambaram Trophy for best Under-22 cricketer: Rahul Dewan (trophy and Rs 50,000)
 M A Chidambaram Trophy for best woman cricketer: Mithali Raj (trophy and Rs 50,000)

Other awards
 Mahendra Singh Dhoni was handed a special award for winning the Rajiv Gandhi Khel Ratna and the Padma Shri.
 Harbhajan Singh was handed a special award for taking 300 Test wickets and winning the Padma Shri.

Ref:

2008–09
 Polly Umrigar Award for international cricketer of the year: Gautam Gambhir (trophy and Rs 500,000)
 CK Nayudu Award for lifetime achievement: Mohinder Amarnath (trophy and Rs 1.5 million)
 Madhavrao Scindia Award for most runs in Ranji Trophy: Wasim Jaffer (trophy and Rs 100,000)
 Madhavrao Scindia Award for most wickets in Ranji Trophy: Dhawal Kulkarni & Ravindra Jadeja (trophy and Rs 100,000)
 Best Cricket Association of the Year for overall performance: Mumbai & Punjab (trophy)
 M A Chidambaram Trophy for best Under-16 cricketer: Chirag Khurana (trophy and Rs 50,000)
 M A Chidambaram Trophy for best Under-19 cricketer: Harpreet Singh (trophy and Rs 50,000)
 M A Chidambaram Trophy for best Under-22 cricketer: Neelkanth Das (trophy and Rs 50,000)
 M A Chidambaram Trophy for best woman cricketer: Reema Malhotra (trophy and Rs 50,000)
 M A Chidambaram Trophy for best woman junior cricketer: Poonam Raut (trophy and Rs 50,000)
 Best umpire: Amish Saheba (trophy and Rs 50,000)

Other awards
 Rahul Dravid was handed a special award for taking the most catches.
 Sachin Tendulkar was handed a special award for completing two decades of international cricket.

Ref:

2009–10
 Polly Umrigar Award for international cricketer of the year: Sachin Tendulkar (trophy and Rs 500,000)
 CK Nayudu Award for lifetime achievement: Salim Durani (trophy and Rs 1.5 million)
 Madhavrao Scindia Award for most runs in Ranji Trophy: Manish Pandey (trophy and Rs 100,000)
 Madhavrao Scindia Award for most wickets in Ranji Trophy: Abhimanyu Mithun (trophy and Rs 100,000)
 Best Cricket Association of the Year for overall performance: Maharashtra (trophy)
 M A Chidambaram Trophy for best Under-16 cricketer: Baba Aparajith (trophy and Rs 50,000)
 M A Chidambaram Trophy for best Under-19 cricketer: Bhargav Merai (trophy and Rs 50,000)
 M A Chidambaram Trophy for best Under-22 cricketer: Natraj Behera (trophy and Rs 50,000)
 M A Chidambaram Trophy for best woman cricketer: Thirush Kamini (trophy and Rs 50,000)
 M A Chidambaram Trophy for best woman junior cricketer: Reva Arora (trophy and Rs 50,000)
 Best umpire: K. Hariharan (trophy and Rs 50,000)

Ref:

2010–11
 Polly Umrigar Award for international cricketer of the year: Rahul Dravid (trophy and Rs 500,000)
 CK Nayudu Award for lifetime achievement: Ajit Wadekar (trophy and Rs 1.5 million)
 Madhavrao Scindia Award for most runs in Ranji Trophy: Subramaniam Badrinath (trophy and Rs 100,000)
 Madhavrao Scindia Award for most wickets in Ranji Trophy: Bhargav Bhatt (trophy and Rs 100,000)
 Best Cricket Association of the Year for overall performance: Railways & Delhi (trophy)
 M A Chidambaram Trophy for best Under-16 cricketer: Vijay Zol (trophy and Rs 50,000)
 M A Chidambaram Trophy for best Under-19 cricketer: Avi Barot (trophy and Rs 50,000)
 M A Chidambaram Trophy for best Under-22 cricketer: Suryakumar Yadav (trophy and Rs 50,000)
 M A Chidambaram Trophy for best woman cricketer: Jhulan Goswami (trophy and Rs 50,000)
 M A Chidambaram Trophy for best woman junior cricketer: Mona Meshram (trophy and Rs 50,000)
 Best umpire: S. Ravi (trophy and Rs 50,000)
 Lala Amarnath Award for best all-rounder in Ranji Trophy: Iqbal Abdulla (trophy and Rs 100,000)
 Lala Amarnath Award for best all-rounder in limited-overs tournaments: Sumit Narwal (trophy and Rs 100,000)

Other awards
 Dilip Sardesai Award for India's best cricketer in the 2011 Test series in the West Indies: Ishant Sharma
 Dilip Sardesai Award for India's best cricketer in the 2011 Test series against the West Indies: Ravichandran Ashwin

Ref:

2011–12
 Polly Umrigar Award for international cricketer of the year: Virat Kohli (trophy and Rs 500,000)
 CK Nayudu Award for lifetime achievement: Sunil Gavaskar (trophy and Rs 1.5 million)
 Madhavrao Scindia Award for most runs in Ranji Trophy: Robin Bist (trophy and Rs 100,000)
 Madhavrao Scindia Award for most wickets in Ranji Trophy: Ashok Dinda (trophy and Rs 100,000)
 Best Cricket Association of the Year for overall performance: Delhi (trophy)
 M A Chidambaram Trophy for best Under-16 cricketer: Mohammad Saif (trophy and Rs 50,000)
 M A Chidambaram Trophy for best Under-19 cricketer: Vijay Zol (trophy and Rs 50,000)
 M A Chidambaram Trophy for best Under-22 cricketer: Satyam Choudhary (trophy and Rs 50,000)
 M A Chidambaram Trophy for best woman cricketer: Anagha Deshpande (trophy and Rs 50,000)
 Best umpire: S. Ravi (trophy and Rs 50,000)
 Lala Amarnath Award for best all-rounder in Ranji Trophy: Stuart Binny (trophy and Rs 100,000)
 Lala Amarnath Award for best all-rounder in limited-overs tournaments: Laxmi Ratan Shukla (trophy and Rs 100,000)

Other awards
 VVS Laxman was handed a special award for his achievements in international cricket.

Ref:

2012–13
 Polly Umrigar Award for international cricketer of the year: Ravichandran Ashwin (trophy and Rs 500,000)
 CK Nayudu Award for lifetime achievement: Kapil Dev (trophy and Rs 2.5 million)
 Madhavrao Scindia Award for most runs in Ranji Trophy: Jiwanjot Singh (trophy and Rs 250,000)
 Madhavrao Scindia Award for most wickets in Ranji Trophy: Ishwar Pandey (trophy and Rs 250,000)
 Best Cricket Association of the Year for overall performance: Mumbai (trophy)
 M A Chidambaram Trophy for best Under-16 cricketer: Arman Jaffer (trophy and Rs 50,000)
 M A Chidambaram Trophy for best Under-19 cricketer: Akshar Patel (trophy and Rs 50,000)
 M A Chidambaram Trophy for best Under-25 cricketer: Karn Sharma (trophy and Rs 50,000)
 M A Chidambaram Trophy for best woman cricketer: Thirush Kamini (trophy and Rs 50,000)
 Best umpire: Chettithody Shamshuddin (trophy and Rs 50,000)
 Lala Amarnath Award for best all-rounder in Ranji Trophy: Abhishek Nayar (trophy and Rs 250,000)
 Lala Amarnath Award for best all-rounder in limited-overs tournaments: Laxmi Ratan Shukla (trophy and Rs 250,000)

Other awards
 Bapu Nadkarni, Farokh Engineer, late Eknath Solkar were handed special awards for outstanding contribution to Indian cricket (trophy and Rs 1.5 million)
 Dilip Sardesai Award for India's best cricketer in the 2013 Test series against the West Indies: Rohit Sharma (trophy and Rs 500,000)

Ref:

2013–14
 Polly Umrigar Award for international cricketer of the year: Bhuvneshwar Kumar (trophy and Rs 500,000)
 CK Nayudu Award for lifetime achievement: Dilip Vengsarkar (trophy and Rs 2.5 million)
 Madhavrao Scindia Award for most runs in Ranji Trophy: Kedar Jadhav (trophy and Rs 250,000)
 Madhavrao Scindia Award for most wickets in Ranji Trophy: Rishi Dhawan (trophy and Rs 250,000)
 Best Cricket Association of the Year for overall performance: Maharashtra & Railways (trophy)
 M A Chidambaram Trophy for best Under-16 cricketer: Shubman Gill (trophy and Rs 50,000)
 M A Chidambaram Trophy for best Under-19 cricketer: Balchander Anirudh (trophy and Rs 50,000)
 M A Chidambaram Trophy for best Under-25 cricketer: Rahul Tripathi (trophy and Rs 50,000)
 M A Chidambaram Trophy for best woman cricketer: Thirush Kamini (trophy and Rs 50,000)
 Best umpire: Anil Chaudhary (trophy and Rs 50,000)
 Lala Amarnath Award for best all-rounder in Ranji Trophy: Parvez Rasool (trophy and Rs 250,000)
 Lala Amarnath Award for best all-rounder in limited-overs tournaments: Vinay Kumar (trophy and Rs 250,000)

Other awards
 Rohit Sharma was handed a special award for scoring the highest ODI individual score of 264.

Ref:

2014–15
 Polly Umrigar Award for international cricketer of the year: Virat Kohli (trophy and Rs 500,000)
 CK Nayudu Award for lifetime achievement: Syed Kirmani (trophy and Rs 2.5 million)
 Madhavrao Scindia Award for most runs in Ranji Trophy: Robin Uthappa (trophy and Rs 250,000)
 Madhavrao Scindia Award for most wickets in Ranji Trophy: Vinay Kumar & Shardul Thakur (trophy and Rs 250,000)
 Best Cricket Association of the Year for overall performance: Karnataka (trophy)
 M A Chidambaram Trophy for best Under-16 cricketer: Shubman Gill (trophy and Rs 50,000)
 M A Chidambaram Trophy for best Under-19 cricketer: Anmolpreet Singh (trophy and Rs 50,000)
 M A Chidambaram Trophy for best Under-23 cricketer: Almas Shaukat (trophy and Rs 50,000)
 M A Chidambaram Trophy for best woman cricketer: Mithali Raj (trophy and Rs 50,000)
 M A Chidambaram Trophy for best woman junior cricketer: Devika Vaidya (trophy and Rs 50,000)
 Best umpire: O. Nandan (trophy and Rs 50,000)
 Lala Amarnath Award for best all-rounder in Ranji Trophy: Jalaj Saxena (trophy and Rs 250,000)
 Lala Amarnath Award for best all-rounder in limited-overs tournaments: Deepak Hooda (trophy and Rs 250,000)

Ref:

2015–16
 Polly Umrigar Award for international cricketer of the year: Virat Kohli
 CK Nayudu Award for lifetime achievement: Rajinder Goel and Padmakar Shivalkar
 BCCI Lifetime Achievement Award For Women: Shanta Rangaswamy
 Madhavrao Scindia Award for most runs in Ranji Trophy: Shreyas Iyer
 Madhavrao Scindia Award for most wickets in Ranji Trophy: Shahbaz Nadeem
 Lala Amarnath Award for best all-rounder in Ranji Trophy: Jalaj Saxena
 Lala Amarnath Award for best all-rounder in limited-overs tournaments: Axar Patel
 Best Cricket Association of the Year for overall performance: Mumbai
 M A Chidambaram Trophy for highest scorer in Under-23 CK Nayudu Trophy: Jay Bista
 M A Chidambaram Trophy for highest wicket-taker in Under-23 CK Nayudu Trophy: Satyajeet Bachhav
 N K P Salve Award for highest scorer in Under-19 Cooch Behar Trophy: Armaan Jaffer
 N K P Salve Award for highest wicket-taker in Under-19 Cooch Behar Trophy: Ninad Rathva
 Raj Singh Dungarpur Award for highest scorer in Under-16 Vijay Merchant Trophy: Abhishek Sharma
 Raj Singh Dungarpur Award for highest wicket-taker in Under-16 Vijay Merchant Trophy: Abhishek Sharma
 Jagmohan Dalmiya Award for best woman cricketer: Mithali Raj
 Jagmohan Dalmiya Award for best woman junior cricketer: Deepti Sharma
 Best umpire: Nitin Menon

Other awards
 Dilip Sardesai Award for India's best cricketer in the 2016 Test series in the West Indies: Ravichandran Ashwin
 Vaman Kumar and late Ramakant Desai were handed special awards for outstanding contribution to Indian cricket

Ref:

2016–17 

 Polly Umrigar Award for international cricketer of the year: Virat Kohli
 Best international woman cricketer: Harmanpreet Kaur
 CK Nayudu Award for lifetime achievement: Pankaj Roy.
 BCCI Lifetime Achievement Award For Women: Diana Edulji
 Madhavrao Scindia Award for most runs in Ranji Trophy: Priyank Panchal
 Madhavrao Scindia Award for most wickets in Ranji Trophy: Shahbaz Nadeem
 Lala Amarnath Award for best all-rounder in Ranji Trophy: Parvez Rasool
 Lala Amarnath Award for best all-rounder in limited-overs tournaments: Krunal Pandya
 Best Cricket Association of the Year for overall performance: Mumbai
 M A Chidambaram Trophy for highest scorer in Under-23 CK Nayudu Trophy: Ekant Sen
 M A Chidambaram Trophy for highest wicket-taker in Under-23 CK Nayudu Trophy: Karan Kaila
 N K P Salve Award for highest scorer in Under-19 Cooch Behar Trophy: Jonty Sidhu
 M A Chidambaram Trophy for highest wicket-taker in Under-19 Cooch Behar Trophy: Rahul Singh (Assam cricketer)
 Raj Singh Dungarpur Award for highest scorer in Under-16 Vijay Merchant Trophy: N Thakur Tilak
 Raj Singh Dungarpur Award for highest wicket-taker in Under-16 Vijay Merchant Trophy: Rohit Dattatraya
 Jagmohan Dalmiya Award for best woman cricketer (Sr Domestic): Punam Raut
 Jagmohan Dalmiya Award for best woman junior cricketer: Jemimah Rodrigues
 Best umpire: Anil Dandekar

2017–18 

 Polly Umrigar Award for international cricketer of the year: Virat Kohli
 Best international woman cricketer: Smriti Mandhana
 CK Nayudu Award for lifetime achievement: Anshuman Gaekwad
 BCCI Lifetime Achievement Award For Women: Sudha Shah
 Madhavrao Scindia Award for most runs in Ranji Trophy: Mayank Agarwal
 Madhavrao Scindia Award for most wickets in Ranji Trophy: Jalaj Saxena
 Lala Amarnath Award for best all-rounder in Ranji Trophy: Jalaj Saxena
 Lala Amarnath Award for best all-rounder in limited-overs tournaments: Diwesh Pathania
 BCCI special award : Budhi Kunderan
M.A. Chidambaram Trophy for highest run-scorer in C. K. Nayudu Trophy: Aryaman Birla
M.A. Chidambaram Trophy for highest wicket-taker in C. K. Nayudu Trophy: Tejas Baroka
M.A. Chidambaram Trophy for highest run-scorer in Cooch Behar Trophy: Yash Rathod
M.A. Chidambaram Trophy for highest wicket-taker in Cooch Behar Trophy: Ayush Jamwal
Jagmohan Dalmiya Trophy for highest run-scorer in Vijay Merchant Trophy: Nithish Kumar
Jagmohan Dalmiya Trophy for highest wicket-taker in Vijay Merchant Trophy: Reshu Raj
Jagmohan Dalmiya Trophy for best woman cricketer (domestic): Deepti Sharma
Jagmohan Dalmiya Trophy for best junior women's player (domestic): Jemimah Rodrigues
Best umpire in domestic cricket: Yeshwant Barde
Best performances in domestic tournaments: Delhi
Ref:

2018–2019 

 Polly Umrigar Award for international cricketer of the year: Jasprit Bumrah
 Best international woman cricketer: Poonam Yadav
 CK Nayudu Award for lifetime achievement: Kris Srikanth
 Best umpire in domestic cricket: Virender Sharma
 Best performances in domestic tournaments: Vidarbha

References

Cricket awards and rankings
Indian cricket lists